Margo Tamez (born 28 January 1962 in Austin, Texas, United States) is a Lipan Apache author of the Hada'didla Nde' ("Lightning Storm People"), Konitsaii Nde' ("Big Water People") and an enrolled citizen of the Lipan Apache Band of Texas.

A scholar, poet, and Indigenous rights defender, Tamez grew up in unceded Lipan Apache territory in South Texas, the Lower Rio Grande Valley and along the Texas-Mexico border.

Tamez's 2007 work, Raven Eye, is considered the first Apache-authored literary work which 'indigenized' the American poetry form known as the 'long poem', a form developed by Norman Dubie.  In Raven Eye, Tamez drew from Athabaskan and Nahua creation stories, oral tradition, and Lipan Apache genocide narratives in combination with autobiography.  Raven Eye connected the Lipan Apache oral narrative structure from the Lower Rio Grande valley and southern Texas to a literary aesthetic form that included pictorial writing and history of resistance. Her poetry is best known for stark, detailed examinations of gender violence, identity, non-recognition, genocide and spaces of abjection (walls, the camp, death march, exile). Her prose reflects the critical views of processes and on-going effects of fragmentation, historical erasure, and dispossession on Indigenous peoples, making crucial links between history and present forces (colonization, militarization) impacting Indigenous self-determination in regions bifurcated by settler nation borders where those who remained in traditional places were largely ignored by the state.

Selected bibliography

Poetry and criticism
 Naked Wanting (University of Arizona Press, 2003).
 Raven Eye  (University of Arizona Press, 2007).
 "Open Letter to Cameron County Commission," 2 Crit 110 (2009).
 "My Mother in Her Being--Photograph ca. 1947," Callaloo, Vol. 32, No. 1, Winter 2009, pp. 185–187.
 "Restoring Lipan Apache Women's Laws, Lands and Strength in El Calaboz Rancheria at the Texas-Mexico Border," Signs, Vol. 35, No. 3, 2010, pp. 558–569.
 "Our Way of Life is Our Resistance":  Indigenous Women and Anti-Imperialist Challenges to Militarization along the U.S.-Mexico Border," Works and Days, Invisible Battlegrounds:  Feminist Resistance in the Global Age of War and Imperialism, Susan Comfort, Editor, 57/58:  Vol. 20, 2011.

Anthologies
 Dance the Guns to Silence: 100 Poems Inspired by Ken Saro-Wiwa
 Sister Nations, Heid Erdrich and Laura Tohe (Editors), New Rivers Press.
 Stories from Where We Live: The Gulf Coast, Sara St. Antoine (Editor), Milkweed Editions.
 Southwestern Women: New Voices, Caitlin L. Gannon (Editor), Javelina Pr.

References

  Birnbaum, Juliana "Raven Eye", Bridges:  A Jewish Feminist Journal, Vol. 13, No. 2, Autumn 2008.
 Eagle Woman, Angelique. "The Eagle and the Condor of the Western Hemisphere: Application of International Indigenous Principles to Halt the United States Border Wall" 45 Idaho Law Review, 555, (2008–2009)
 Environmental Leadership Program, Fellowship Program, 'Margo Tamez'
 Gilman, Denise.  "Seeking Breaches in the Wall:  An International Human Rights Law Challenge to the Texas-Mexico Border Wall," Texas International Law Journal, Vol. 46, pp. 257-293.
 Kinberg, Clare. "Notes on Border Walls and Cultural Exchange", Project Muse, Bridges: A Jewish Feminist Journal, Spring 2011, Vol. 46, Issue 2, pp 257–293.
 Hanksville:  Storytellers Native American Authors Online
 Chandra, "Imperial Democracies, Militarised Zones, Feminist Engagements," Economic & Political Weekly, Vol XLVI No. 13, March 26, 2011.
  T.V., "Toxic Colonialism, Environmental Justice, and Native Resistance in Silko's Almanac of the Dead," MELUS, Vol. 34, No. 2, Ethnicity and Ecocriticism (Summer, 2009), pp. 25-42.
 Tamez, Margo. "Restoring Lipan Apache Women's Laws, Lands and Strength in El Calaboz Rancheria at the Texas-Mexico Border", Signs: Journal of Women in Culture and Society, Vol 35, No.3.
 Tamez, Margo "Drinking Under the Moon She Goes Laughing." Poetry Foundation
 Tamez, Margo  "Addiction to the Dead." Poetry Foundation
 Tamez, Margo "Difficult and Blessed", Peace Review, Vol. 11, Issue 3, Sept. 1999, 469-470.

External links
 Interview: Conspiring with Poet Margo Tamez
 Margo Tamez:  Biography, Native American Authors Project

1962 births
Apache people
Living people
Native American activists
Native American writers
Native American women writers
20th-century Native American women
20th-century Native Americans
21st-century Native American women
21st-century Native Americans
20th-century American women writers
21st-century American women writers